The Tupolev ANT-16 (also known as the TB-4;  – Heavy Bomber) was an experimental heavy bomber aircraft designed and tested in the Soviet Union in the early 1930s.

Design and development
Conceptually representing evolution of the TB-3 bomber, the ANT-16 was designed under the doctrine that size and payload were more important for a bomber than speed because it would be able to protect itself with defensive armament. The twin  bomb bays were the largest in the world at that time and presented many design challenges in order to preserve structural rigidity of the airframe.

The sole prototype first flew on 3 July 1933 with M. M. Gromov at the controls. The test flight program was completed by 29 September 1933 with disappointing results. The two top-mounted engines performed poorly and a significant portion of thrust generated by the wing-mounted engines was absorbed by the two meter-thick (6 ft 7 in) wing. A proposal to re-equip the aircraft with Mikulin AM-35 engines of 933 kW (1,250 hp) was not implemented. A second prototype was under construction, but was never finished (construction stopped 2 July 1933); some of its parts were used in the ANT-20.

Specifications (ANT-16)

See also

References

1930s Soviet bomber aircraft
ANT-16
Abandoned military aircraft projects of the Soviet Union
Six-engined push-pull aircraft
Aircraft first flown in 1933